Ida Jones (born 6 August 1911, date of death unknown) was an English athlete who competed in the 1934 British Empire Games. At the event, she won the silver medal in the 880 yards event.

External links
Profile at TOPS in athletics

1911 births
Year of death missing
English female middle-distance runners
Athletes (track and field) at the 1934 British Empire Games
Commonwealth Games silver medallists for England
Commonwealth Games medallists in athletics
Medallists at the 1934 British Empire Games